The Polish Academy Award for Best Actress is an annual award given to the best lead actress in Polish picture.

Winners and nominees

Multiple awards and nominations

References

External links
 Polish Film Awards; Official website 

Film awards for lead actress
Polish film awards
Awards established in 1999
1999 establishments in Poland